Pacific News may refer to:

 Pacific News Service, a non-profit media organization based in the United States
 Pacific News, the original name of Pacific RailNews, a defunct magazine about railways
 Pacific News (ISSN 1435-8360), the semi-annual publication of the Association of Pacific Studies (Arbeitsgemeinschaft fuer Pazifische Studien e.V., APSA), Hamburg University